Jurij Rodionov is the defending champion.

Seeds

Draw

Finals

Top half

Bottom half

References

External links
Main draw
Qualifying draw

Challenger Biel/Bienne - 1